Autographa excelsa is a moth of the family Noctuidae. It is found in the Baltic region, southern Finland, the Tatra Mountains, northern European Russia, Siberia, the Korean Peninsula and Japan.

The wingspan is 38–42 mm. Adults are on wing from the end of July to August.

The larvae feed on Urtica species.

External links
Fauna Europaea
lepidoptera.pl

Plusiini
Moths of Asia
Moths of Europe
Moths described in 1862